String topology, a branch of mathematics, is the study of algebraic structures on the homology of free loop spaces.

Motivation
While the singular cohomology of a space has always a product structure, this is not true for the singular homology of a space. Nevertheless, it is possible to construct such a structure for an oriented manifold  of dimension . This is the so-called intersection product. One way to make this construction rigorous is to use stratifolds.

Another case, where the homology of a space has a product, is the (based) loop space  of a space . Here the space itself has a product 

by going first through the first loop and then through the second one. A substitute for the map  is the map 
 

The Chas–Sullivan product
The idea of the Chas–Sullivan product is to now combine the product structures above. We need a map

One way to construct this is to use stratifolds (or another geometric definition of homology) to do transversal intersection (after interpreting  as an inclusion of Hilbert manifolds). Composing the induced map in homology with the Thom isomorphism, we get the map we want.

Remarks
As in the case of the intersection product, there are different sign conventions concerning the Chas–Sullivan product. In some convention, it is graded commutative, in some it is not.
By an easy variation of the above construction, we get that  is a module over  if  is a manifold of dimensions .
The Serre spectral sequence is compatible with the above algebraic structures for both the fiber bundle  with fiber  and the fiber bundle  for a fiber bundle , which is important for computations (see  and ).

The Batalin–Vilkovisky structure
There is an action  by rotation, which induces a map 
.
Plugging in the fundamental class , gives an operator 

of degree 1. This operator tends to be difficult to compute in general. The defining identities of a Batalin-Vilkovisky algebra were checked in the original paper "by pictures." A less direct, but arguably more conceptual way to do that could be by using an action of a cactus operad on the free loop space . The cactus operad is weakly equivalent to the framed little disks operad and its action on a topological space implies a Batalin-Vilkovisky structure on homology.

Field theories

There are several attempts to construct (topological) field theories via string topology. The basic idea is to fix an oriented manifold  and associate to every surface with  incoming and  outgoing boundary components (with ) an operation

which fulfills the usual axioms for a topological field theory. The Chas–Sullivan product is associated to the pair of pants. It can be shown that these operations are 0 if the genus of the surface is greater than 0.

References

Sources
 
 
 
 
 

Geometric topology
Algebraic topology
String theory